Gymnastics events at the 1981 Southeast Asian Games was held between 7 December to 11 December at University of Philippines, Quezon City, Philippines.

Medal summary

Men

Women's

Medal table

References
 https://eresources.nlb.gov.sg/newspapers/Digitised/Article/straitstimes19811208-1.2.144
 https://eresources.nlb.gov.sg/newspapers/Digitised/Article/straitstimes19811209-1.2.133.6
 https://eresources.nlb.gov.sg/newspapers/Digitised/Article/straitstimes19811210-1.2.115.4

1981 Southeast Asian Games events
Southeast Asian Games
1981
Gymnastics competitions in Indonesia